Ken Roger Burvall (born 27 March 1966) is a Swedish former footballer. He played for Kalmar AIK, Djurgårdens IF, Östers IF, Kalmar FF, Admira Wacker Wien, Kalmar FF, Loverslunds BK, IFK Berga. He made four appearances for Sweden national football team.

References

Swedish footballers
Djurgårdens IF Fotboll players
Östers IF players
Kalmar FF players
1966 births
Living people
Association football midfielders